The Daughter of the Samurai is a 1937 German-Japanese drama film directed by Arnold Fanck and Mansaku Itami and starring Setsuko Hara, Ruth Eweler and Sessue Hayakawa. It was the first of two co-productions between Imperial Japan and Nazi Germany. Fanck, who was famous for making mountaineering films, was possibly chosen as director  because of his connections to the Nazi Party. Fanck and Itami clashed a great deal during the film's production, and in effect created two separate versions for release in their respective countries.

Plot
Yamato Teruo (Isamu Kosugi) returns to Japan after spending six years at an agricultural college in Germany. Teruo is the adopted son of an old samurai family, and is expected to marry the eldest daughter, Mitsuko (Setsuko Hara). However, Teruo has become infected with the idea of Western individualism during his stay in Western Europe, and refuses to bow to the demands of society. Instead, he confounds his future father-in-law Yamato Iwao (Sessue Hayakawa) by announcing that he intends to marry a German journalist, Gerda Storm (Ruth Eweler), whom he met on the ship back to Japan. Gerda, however, is a blonde, chaste, Aryan woman, and will not agree to a mixed-race relationship. She attempts to convince him of his duty to the Japanese race and traditions and to reconcile him with his family.

Meanwhile, Mitsuko, feeling dishonored by Teruo's rejection, attempts to commit suicide by throwing herself into a volcano. She is rescued at the last second by Teruo, and the couple is romantically reunited. Sometime later, the young couple and their baby are now living in Manchukuo, the "New Earth", working on a farm under the benevolent gaze of a vigilant soldier guarding against the ever-present threat of Bolshevism.

Cast

Reception
The film was poorly received in Japan. It was viewed as a condescending treatment of Japan as an exotic Oriental nation that needed German political ideas as if it had none of its own, and the racist ideology of blood and soil was considered disturbing. One reviewer wrote:

Notes

References

Bibliography

 
 Hull, David Stewart. Film in the Third Reich: a Study of the German Cinema, 1933-1945. University of California Press, 1969.
 Mayo, Marlene J. & Rimer J. Thomas & Kerkham, H. Eleanor. War, Occupation, and Creativity: Japan and East Asia, 1920-1960. University of Hawaii Press, 2001.

External links

 
 Infos about the shooting of The Daughter of The Samurai with link to the photogallery

1937 multilingual films
1937 films
Anti-communist propaganda
German multilingual films
Films of Nazi Germany
Japanese romantic drama films
1930s German-language films
1930s Japanese-language films
Fascist propaganda
Films directed by Arnold Fanck
Films directed by Mansaku Itami
Films set in Japan
Japanese multilingual films
German romantic drama films
1937 romantic drama films
German black-and-white films
Japanese black-and-white films
1930s German films